John McGraw (1873–1934) was an American baseball player and manager.

John McGraw may also refer to:

 John McGraw (merchant) (1815–1877), New York lumber tycoon and one of the founding trustees of Cornell University
 John McGraw (governor) (1850–1910), governor of Washington from 1893 to 1897
 John McGraw (pitcher) (1890–1967), American baseball pitcher
 John McGraw (brigadier general) (1912–1976), American soldier and surgeon
 Jon McGraw (born 1979), American football player in the National Football League